Jacob Rabon IV (born December 19, 1995), better known by his online pseudonym Alpharad, is an American YouTuber, esports personality, and musician. He is best known for his gaming videos on the Super Smash Bros. series along with his participation in the fighting game community as a tournament organizer.

Early life 
Rabon was born on December 19, 1995, in Norman, Oklahoma. He gained an interest in filmmaking around the fifth grade, uploading comedic videos for his friends, one of his first videos being Major O's. Later, he would take video editing and cinematography classes in high school. Rabon attended the University of Oklahoma while making YouTube videos as a full-time job. However, he later stated that he dropped out to fully focus on his rising YouTube career. His original goal was to be a writer, director, or editor of some kind, but soon learned that in being someone else's editor he couldn't have as much creative freedom as he could making his own content.

Career

YouTube 

Rabon created his main YouTube channel on January 13, 2014. Since its creation, he has made various gaming videos on his channel, Alpharad, including the Super Smash Bros. series, Pokémon, Splatoon, Sonic the Hedgehog, and Fall Guys, as well as other Nintendo titles. He has also dabbled in speedrunning, specifically in a video of him intensely playing through a Super Mario 64 first-person shooter fan game, as well as being a retired Super Mario Odyssey speedrunner. 

Other videos of his include video game related challenges and streams. In 2021, Rabon collaborated with YouTuber Jaiden Animations on a charity stream for Red Nose Day which involved removing Pokémon from their team after reaching various donation incentives. In 2022, he played Pokémon Go in the Warner Grand theater located in Los Angeles during a Halloween event.

In 2020, Rabon signed with the Creative Artists Agency alongside YouTuber The Completionist. Rabon's main YouTube channel has reached over 2.91 million subscribers as of December 2022.

Esports 
Rabon has been involved in esports as a tournament organizer and affiliate with other prominent esports personalities. In January 2020, he participated in a Pokémon VGC tournament hosted by Wolfe Glick with fellow competitive Super Smash Bros. players Ludwig Ahgren, ESAM, and Mew2King amongst other content creators.

Two months later, in the midst of the COVID-19 pandemic, Rabon co-hosted five online tournaments for Super Smash Bros. Ultimate called the "Quarantine Series" with fellow YouTuber Cr1TiKaL, which consisted of two events, Minors and Majors, offering $5,000 and $10,000 in prizes, respectively. The major invitationals featured top Super Smash Bros. players such as MKLeo, Samsora, Nairo and Marss, and was streamed on both Cr1TiKaL's Twitch channel and Rabon's YouTube channel.

In 2018, Rabon purchased a monthly stake for the esports organization, Panda Global, becoming their content director and a minority shareholder. He had previously expressed his desire to hold more weight in the organization.

In 2021, Rabon hosted another tournament in Super Smash Bros. Ultimate, dubbed a "Portal Smash" tournament, that involved competitive players fighting on recreated stages with added obstacles and hazards. Later in October, Rabon hosted a Nickelodeon All-Star Brawl charity tournament with Panda Global member Coney for The Breast Cancer Research Foundation. The tournament featured content creators such as Cr1TiKaL, Ludwig Ahgren, Jaiden Animations and Trihex, and ultimately raised over $100,000.

Other ventures

Music 
Rabon is also a musician, and he formed a band named Ace of Hearts. Their first single was "Fool for You", which was released on April 1, 2020. The band's first EP, Monophobia, was released on June 5, 2020. This was then followed by another single, "Silver Lining", which was released nearly a month later on July 1, 2020. The band's second EP, Scorpion Queen, was released on December 13, 2020. The band's single "Lights Off" was released on March 31, 2021. Ace of Hearts' most recent single, "Deadbeat Boulevard", released on November 11, 2021. Their newest album "Frozen in Time" was released on December 10, 2021.

Copypasta Theatre 
On June 27, 2021, Rabon announced a one-time pop-up show to be held the very same day. He and thirteen other creators dramatically read copypastas to a live audience at the Black Box theatre in Los Angeles. Stage guests included Daniel Thrasher, Adriana Figueroa, Drumsy, Mari Norwood, Jules Conroy, Phil Visu, Cristina Vee Valenzuela, Ross O'Donovan, Dan Fulling, C. J. Ya, Johnny Rico (who impersonated Bruno Mars), and Rabon’s project manager Deanna Gowland. The viral video of the performance involved a segment where several of gaming streamer Ninja’s Twitter posts were read aloud; Ninja later shared the video on his Twitter page.

Personal life 
In 2018, Rabon married his long-time girlfriend, Fiorella Zoll. They were living in their home state, Oklahoma, before moving to Los Angeles alongside close friend and frequent collaborator JoSniffy. On June 15, 2020, Rabon came out as bisexual. Rabon announced his divorce to his wife Fiorella on October 20, 2021, stating that they had been separated for some time before the announcement. During an episode of Rabon and Coney's podcast, How Did We Get Here?, Rabon opened up about his experience being diagnosed with ADHD. In the same podcast, he also revealed that he is somewhere in the asexual aromantic spectrum.

See also 
Super Smash Bros. in esports

References

External links

Ace Of Hearts (Spotify)

Gaming YouTubers
People from Norman, Oklahoma
1995 births
YouTube channels launched in 2014
Living people
University of Oklahoma alumni
LGBT people from Oklahoma
Bisexual men
Bisexual musicians
American bisexual people
LGBT YouTubers
21st-century American LGBT people
American LGBT musicians
Aromantic men
Asexual men
YouTubers from Oklahoma